Sinofranchetia is a genus of flowering plant in the Lardizabalaceae family. It contains a single species, Sinofranchetia chinensis, endemic to China.

Description and ecology
Sinofranchetia chinensis is a deciduous, woody climber. It occurs in dense forests along valleys, forest margins, among shrubs in south-central China.

References

Lardizabalaceae
Monotypic Ranunculales genera
Taxa named by William Hemsley (botanist)
Endemic flora of China